Destiny Upside Down (Thai: คนป่วนสายฟ้า) is a 1998 film, starred Shahkrit Yamnam, Jessadaporn Pholdee and Sonia Couling.

Plot 
The story of two young men, “Itthiphon” and “Thaenkhun”. Their destinies were set to be born on the same day and almost at the same time. Both were raised and grew up in a totally different ways:

“Thaenkhun” with affection and warmth, while “Itthiphon” was spoiled by money. Somehow, “Itthiphon” manages to be successful whatever he does, and when Tan is transferred to the same school, both of their lives are to be dramatically changed.

Cast 

 Shahkrit Yamnam as Itthiphon
 Jessadaporn Pholdee as Thaenkhun
 Sonia Couling as Chik
Billy Ogan as Piam
 Watchara Paniam as Producer
 Krit Sukramongkhon as Banthat
 Lek Isun as Itthiphon's father
 Khathariya Kanchanarot as Itthiphon's mother
 Chayut Burakamkowit as Kanchit
 Wichai Chongprasitphon as Maeo

Awards and nominations 

 Thailand National Film Association Awards - Best Supporting Actor Billy Ogan
 Cinemag Spirit Awards 2 - Best Supporting Actor Billy Ogan

References

External links 

 
 Destiny Upside Down Official site
"คนป่วนสายฟ้า"...ชะตาฉันใครลิขิต 
สุดปัง!! "ชาคริต" หวนเจอ "ติ๊ก" ในรอบ 20 ปี
พิม ซอนย่า หวนคืนหนังไทย ปลื้มบทถูกใจใน รัก
วิจารณ์หนัง บังเอิญ...รักไม่สิ้นสุด โดย อุดม อุดมโรจน์
ตัวอย่าง - คนป่วนสายฟ้า Destiny Upside down Official Trailer
命运变奏曲 คนป่วนสายฟ้า (1998)
https://www.siamzone.com/movie/m/1567
https://www.thairath.co.th/content/468984

Thai action comedy films
Thai-language films
1998 films
Five Star Production films